Seymour Perry Berger (July 12, 1923 – December 14, 2014) was an employee of the Topps company for over 50 years. He is credited as being the co-designer of the 1952 Topps baseball series, as is regarded as "the father of modern baseball cards".

Personal life 
Berger, who was Jewish, was born on July 12, 1923, on the Lower East Side neighborhood of Manhattan, to Louis (a furrier) and Rebecca Berger. As a boy, he collected baseball cards, traded them and won some from friends by flipping for them. He served in the Army Air Forces in World War II and later graduated from Bucknell University with an accounting degree. While in college, Berger met Joel Shorin, son of Philip Shorin, one of the founders of Topps.

Berger died on December 14, 2014, aged 91, at home in Rockville Centre, New York. He is survived by his wife of 69 years (Gloria Karpf Berger), three children, five grandchildren, and two great-grandchildren.

Topps 
Berger's first day at Topps was also the first day that Topps began to produce Bazooka Gum. In the autumn of 1951, Berger, then aged 28, designed the 1952 Topps baseball card set with Woody Gelman on the kitchen table of his apartment on Alabama Avenue in Brooklyn. The card design included a player's name, photo, facsimile autograph, team name and logo on the front; and the player's height, weight, bats, throws, birthplace, birthday, stats and a short biography on the back.

In an interview, Berger noted that the cards did not contain a reference to the particular year, because, he recalls thinking, "maybe if this thing is a dud, how are we going to get rid of the cards?" The basic design is still in use today. Berger would work for Topps for 50 years (1947–97), achieve the position of vice-president of sports & licensing, and serve as a consultant for another five, becoming a well-known figure on the baseball scene and the face of Topps to major league baseball players, whom he signed up annually and paid in merchandise, like refrigerators and carpeting.

In 1960, because "nobody wanted the stuff" and Topps needed the storage space, Berger had the equivalent of three garbage trucks full of 1952 Topps baseball cards loaded onto a barge. The barge was tugged a few miles, and the cards were dumped into the Atlantic Ocean.

At 81, Berger was still busy in various activities, including advising Topps, representing his old friend Willie Mays, playing with his grandchildren and an occasional round of golf.

Legacy
Since 1978, Berger was a member of the Society for American Baseball Research (SABR).

In 1988, he was honored by the National Baseball Hall of Fame.

He also earned his own baseball card, #137 in the 2004 Topps series called All-Time Fan Favorites.

Berger was inducted into the National Jewish Sports Hall of Fame on April 29, 2012, and acknowledged by the New York Senate for this attainment of success and personal achievement.

Berger was inducted into the Baseball Reliquary's Shrine of the Eternals in 2015.

References

External links

Baseball cards
2014 deaths
1923 births
Topps
United States Army Air Forces personnel of World War II
People from the Lower East Side
Bucknell University alumni
Jewish American military personnel
21st-century American Jews